Jamalabad (also Romanized as Jamālābād; also known as Jamālābād-e Chār Rāh) is a village in Aliabad-e Malek Rural District, in the Central District of Arsanjan County, Fars Province, Iran. At the 2006 census, its population was 1,191, in 313 families.

References 

Populated places in Arsanjan County